Waukon may refer to a place in the United States:

 Waukon, Iowa
 Waukon, Washington
 Waukon Township, Minnesota